Anbargah (also Romanized as Ānbārgāh) is a village in Tolbozan Rural District, Golgir District, Masjed Soleyman County, Khuzestan Province, Iran. At the 2006 census, its population was 102, in 19 families.

References 

Populated places in Masjed Soleyman County